The United Rentals 176 at The Glen was a NASCAR Camping World Truck Series racing event at the Watkins Glen International road course in Watkins Glen, New York.

The race was introduced in 1996 as part of a Truck Series schedule expansion, and the inaugural running was won by Ron Hornaday Jr. Being on a road course, the race attracted road course ringers with road racing experience that included Ron Fellows, who won twice in 1997 and 1999. It was removed from the calendar in 2000 due to scheduling conflicts, but was re-added in 2021 as the Truck Series' final race before the NASCAR playoffs. Watkins Glen was one of three road courses on the 2021 Truck Series schedule along with the Daytona International Speedway road course and Circuit of the Americas. The race was dropped again in 2022.

History
The first NASCAR Craftsman Truck Series event at Watkins Glen International was held in 1996, as one of eight new tracks added to the schedule that season, and the only road course among them. The inaugural Parts America 150 took place on August 25, two weeks after the NASCAR Winston Cup Series' The Bud at The Glen; Cup drivers like Joe Nemechek and Geoff Bodine, who owned Truck Series teams, also ran the Truck race to develop additional familiarity with the track. Bodine, who won the Cup race, had not planned to run the race but chose to do so after receiving an entry fee from the track. The weekend, which included support races by the NASCAR Busch Series and Featherlite Modified Tour, attracted what track press director J. J. O'Malley described as "an awful lot of interest" partly due to the Truck Series' rise in popularity and the presence of Cup drivers. Steve Park, driving Nemechek's truck, was the fastest driver in qualifying to win the pole position but did not participate in the race as Nemechek returned to the ride. Nemechek started the race last and finished second behind Ron Hornaday Jr., who took the lead from Mike Skinner on lap 21 and led the rest of the race.

The 1997 Parts America 150's qualifying session was delayed by rain and oil on the track. Ron Fellows won the pole and eventually the race after passing points leader Jack Sprague for the lead with seven laps remaining and successfully conserving his fuel. Fellows, a road course ringer who won at Watkins Glen in the Trans-Am Series in 1994 and 1995, was the first Canadian driver to win a race in the series; he did so in his third career start and for a team that did not reserve a garage space as the entry had been hastily arranged. He was also the only race winner in 1997 that did not run the full Truck schedule.

For 1998, the Parts America 150 was moved to May to better serve as an undercard for the Cup race and provide opportunities for NASCAR to make changes to the track for the parent series if necessary. Fellows won the pole with a track-record lap time of 1:15.079 (surpassing his 1997 time of 1:15.149), while among the seven drivers who failed to qualify was Lonnie Rush, who rolled his truck twice in practice and was forced to qualify in a replacement from Jeff Spraker. In the race, Hornaday was the first to cross the finish line but received a two-second time penalty for jumping the final restart, and the win was given to runner-up Joe Ruttman.

Held in conjunction with the Busch Series, the weekend was promoted as a "Festival of Speed and Sound" and included musical performances by artists like Blessid Union of Souls and Edwin McCain. Rain during practice for the race led to the first usage of Goodyear's rain tire in a NASCAR points-awarding race weekend. Once again starting from the pole, Fellows overcame a late pit stop necessitated by an oil-covered windshield to catch leader Mike Wallace and pass him with five laps left.

The 2000 race saw championship leader and pole sitter Greg Biffle lead the final 13 laps to win his third consecutive race and fourth in the last five events, with Kurt Busch following to clinch a Roush Racing 1–2 finish. Sprague rebounded from an opening-lap spin that dropped him to 32nd to finish third, while Fellows finished fifth after starting last in a backup truck after his brake pedal failed during qualifying and caused him to miss the race in his original entry.

The race was dropped from the schedule in 2001 due to scheduling conflicts as Watkins Glen officials had attempted to organize for a weekend close to July 4, but the lone available date on July 8 clashed with the Truck date at Kansas Speedway. As a result, the 2001 Truck Series calendar exclusively featured oval tracks.

After a two-decade absence, the Watkins Glen race returned to the Truck schedule in 2021 as the 15th and final race before the NASCAR playoffs; it was also one of four road course events on the initial schedule, the most in series history. According to track president Michael Printup, the date became available as travel restrictions in response to the COVID-19 pandemic resulted in other tracks canceling their races.

NASCAR revealed the race distances in January, with Watkins Glen's being 72 laps long and divided into stages of 20, 25, and 27 laps. United Rentals assumed title sponsorship for the race in July. Lightning and scheduling concerns related to the Xfinity race later in the day resulted in the United Rentals 176 being shortened to 61 laps, with United Rentals-sponsored driver Austin Hill being declared the winner as he was the leader at the time of the stoppage.

Watkins Glen was dropped for a second time in 2022. Printup responded to the news by commenting, "Of course we want it back again, but we have to work with NASCAR and see if we can get it in the schedules."

Past winners

Notes
 1998: Race extended due to a green–white–checker finish.
 2021: Race shortened due to weather.

Multiple winners (drivers)

Multiple winners (teams)

Manufacturer wins

References

External links
 

1996 establishments in New York (state)
2021 disestablishments in New York (state)
 
Former NASCAR races
Recurring sporting events established in 1996
Recurring sporting events disestablished in 2021